2015 Regional League Division 2 Central & Western  Region is the 3rd season of the League competition since its establishment in 2013. It is in the third tier of the Thai football league system.

Changes from last season

Team changes

Promoted clubs

No club was promoted to the Thai Division 1 League. Last years league champions Hua Hin and runners up Phetchaburi failed to qualify from the 2014 Regional League Division 2 championsleague round.

Relocated clubs

Singburi moved into the 2015 Thai Division 2 League Northern Region.

Renamed clubs

 J.W. BU renamed J.W. Police.
 Seeker renamed PTU Pathum Thani Seeker.
 Globlex F.C. renamed Globlex TWD.

Withdrawn clubs

Muangkan United have withdrawn from the 2015 campaign.

Expansion clubs

Simork joined the newly expanded league setup.

Stadium and locations

League table

References

External links
Kondivision 2

3